The Melvill Cup is the badminton team competition for South Africa provinces.  The cup was first held in 1950. Later on title competitions for B and AC teams were added alongside the highest-A level teams.

Champions

External links
 Badminton South Africa

Badminton tournaments in South Africa
Badminton in South Africa
Recurring sporting events established in 1950
1950 establishments in South Africa